The 1953–54 Washington Huskies men's basketball team represented the University of Washington for the 1953–54 NCAA college basketball season. Led by fourth-year head coach Tippy Dye, the Huskies were members of the Pacific Coast Conference and played their home games on campus at Hec Edmundson Pavilion in Seattle, Washington.

References

External links
Sports Reference – Washington Huskies: 1953–54 basketball season

Washington Huskies men's basketball seasons
Washington
Washington
Washington